Jindal Tanmar Thermal Power Plant is a coal-based thermal power plant located in Tamnar village near Raigarh town in Raigarh district in the Indian state of Chhattisgarh. The power plant is operated by the Jindal Power Limited which is a subsidiary of Jindal Steel and Power.

The coal for the plant is sourced from captive coal mine. The Engineering, procurement and construction contract was given to Bharat Heavy Electricals.

Capacity
It has planned capacity of 3400 MW (4x250 MW, 4x600 MW).

References

External links

 Tamnar power station at SourceWatch

Raigarh district
Coal-fired power stations in Chhattisgarh
2007 establishments in Chhattisgarh
Energy infrastructure completed in 2007